Urban Safari is a 1996 Swiss comedy film directed by Reto Salimbeni and starring David Naughton.

External links

1996 films
1996 comedy films
Swiss independent films
Films set in the United States
Films shot in Vancouver
1990s English-language films